Eremophila pilosa is a flowering plant in the figwort family, Scrophulariaceae and is endemic to Western Australia. It is a small shrub with many tangled branches, with its leaves and branches densely covered with hairs and which has mauve or purple flowers. It occurs in a restricted area in the Pilbara.

Description
The branches also have prominent raised leaf bases.

The petal tube is deep lilac to pale purple on the outside and white with purple spots or streaks inside. The outer surface is hairy but the inner surface of the petal lobes is glabrous and the inside of the tube is filled with woolly hairs. The 4 stamens are fully enclosed in the petal tube.

Taxonomy and naming 
This species was first formally described by Robert Chinnock in 2007 and the description was published in Eremophila and Allied Genera: A Monograph of the Plant Family Myoporaceae. The specific epithet (pilosa) is derived from the Latin word meaning "hairy".

Distribution and habitat
Eremophila pilosa grows in red-brown clay loam on sandy plains between Jigalong and Roy Hill in the Pilbara biogeographic region.

Conservation
Eremophila pilosa is classified as "Priority One" by the Western Australian Government Department of Parks and Wildlife, meaning that it is known from only one or a few locations which are potentially at risk.

References

Eudicots of Western Australia
pilosa
Endemic flora of Western Australia
Plants described in 2007
Taxa named by Robert Chinnock